Ocalea is a genus of the rove beetles (insects in the family Staphylinidae). The group contains 24 species which can be found on the mainland of Europe (mostly in Romania) North America (British Columbia and perhaps other locations), and in New Zealand.

Species
Ocalea agnita 
Ocalea badia
Ocalea columbiana
Ocalea franciscana
Ocalea grandicollis 
Ocalea gyorgyi
Ocalea robusta

References

Aleocharinae genera
Beetles of Europe